Boubacar Guèye (born 1962) is a retired Senegalese high jumper.

Regionally he won silver medals at the 1982 and 1984 African Championships, the gold medal at the 1988 African Championships, the bronze medal at the 1989 African Championships, and the silver medal at the 1991 All-Africa Games.

References

1962 births
Living people
Senegalese male high jumpers
African Games silver medalists for Senegal
African Games medalists in athletics (track and field)
Athletes (track and field) at the 1991 All-Africa Games
20th-century Senegalese people
21st-century Senegalese people